Fiorenza is an obsolete name for Florence, used during the Middle Ages. It is also an Italian female given name, equivalent to the English Florence. It may refer to:

People
 Fiorenza (name), list of people with the name

Other
 Fiorenza (play), play by Thomas Mann
 13638 Fiorenza, asteroid

See also
Fiorenzo, a given name
Florence (given name)